Binoy Henyo (International title: Wonder Kid / ) is a 2013 Philippine television drama comedy series broadcast by GMA Network. Directed by Albert Langitan, it stars David Remo in the title role. It premiered on July 22, 2013 on the network's Telebabad line up replacing Home Sweet Home. The series concluded on September 20, 2013 with a total of 45 episodes. It was replaced by Prinsesa ng Buhay Ko in its timeslot.

The series is streaming online on YouTube.

Cast and characters
Lead cast
 David Remo as Robin "Binoy" Santos

Supporting cast
 Sheena Halili as Agnes Santos
 Luis Alandy as Francis Sandoval
 Nova Villa as Chato Santos
 Gwen Zamora as Emily Sandoval
 Angel Satsumi as Len-Len de Guzman

Recurring cast
 Lorenzo "Tata" Mara as Alfredo Sandoval
 Rich Asuncion as Josie Cresencio
 Ervic Vijandre as Lito de Guzman
 Lucho Ayala as James Sandoval
 Sharmaine Arnaiz as Celia de Guzman
 Frencheska Farr as Sandy
 Gene Padilla as Domeng
 Zyriel Jestre as Botchok

Episodes

Ratings
According to AGB Nielsen Philippines' Mega Manila household television ratings, the pilot episode of Binoy Henyo earned a 14% rating. While the final episode scored an 18.3% rating.

Accolades

References

External links
 
 

2013 Philippine television series debuts
2013 Philippine television series endings
Filipino-language television shows
GMA Network drama series
Television shows set in Quezon City